The Midland Railway (MR) 1322 Class was a class of small 0-4-0ST steam locomotives designed for shunting. The next class of shunting engines built by the Midland was the 1116A Class, which was nearly identical.

Numbering
Ten engines were built at Derby Works, five in 1883 and the remainder in 1889–1890.  Their original numbers were 1322–1326, 202, 1428–1430, 1697.  In 1892 they were all placed on the duplicate list as 1322A–1326A, 202A, 1428A–1430A, 1697A.

Disposal
Nos 202A and 1429A were withdrawn before the Midland's 1907 renumbering scheme, leaving the remainder to become 1500–1507.  By 1928, all but 1506 had been withdrawn, and in 1930 the survivor 1506 was renumbered 1509 to make room for the ex-S&DJR Fox, Walker 0-6-0ST locomotives taken into LMS stock that year. This engine survived, having been transferred to departmental stock in 1924, and used as a works shunter at Derby Works. It was withdrawn in November 1949.  It was allocated the British Railways number 41509. It was not preserved.

Notes 
Sources are unclear whether it received it however, but this question should be answerable

References 

 
 
 

1322 Class
0-4-0ST locomotives
Railway locomotives introduced in 1883
Standard gauge steam locomotives of Great Britain